Different for Girls is a compilation album with songs from Joe Jackson covered by women artists and female-fronted bands. This album turns Joe Jackson's best tunes on their head with gender-bending takes that manage to bring out the sweet (in the title track), the rawk ("Look Sharp!"), the glitter ("Steppin' Out"), and the agony ("Breaking Us in Two") that made Jackson one of the eighties' best, and most memorable, songwriters.

Track listing

Personnel 
 Production
 Moe Schober – producer
 Rick Schober – producer, photography
 Larry Luddecke – mastering engineer

References 

Tribute albums
2004 compilation albums
Rock compilation albums